The 2007 Arizona Wildcats baseball team represented the University of Arizona during the 2007 NCAA Division I baseball season. The Wildcats played their home games at Jerry Kindall Field at Frank Sancet Stadium. The team was coached by Andy Lopez in his 6th season at Arizona. The Wildcats finished with a record of 42-17 (15-9 Conf.) and were selected to the NCAA Tournament for the 4th time under Andy Lopez's leadership, losing in the Wichita Regional final to Wichita State.

Previous season 
The Wildcats finished the 2006 season with a record of 27-28 (12-12 Conf.), missing the postseason for the first time since Andy Lopez's first season in 2002 and only the second time in his tenure.

Personnel

Roster

Coaches

Opening day

Schedule and results

Wichita Regional

2007 MLB Draft

References 

Arizona
Arizona Wildcats baseball seasons
Arizona baseball